The Art of Vacationing (also known as Goofy in The Art of Vacationing) is  2012 American fantasy comedy short film featuring Goofy made to promote the Disneyland Resort. The film is directed by Matt Wyatt and stars Bill Farmer as Goofy and Corey Burton as the Narrator. The film features Goofy taking a vacation to the Disneyland Resort.

Plot 
Goofy leaves his playhouse in Mickey's Toontown and checks into Disney's Grand Californian Hotel and Spa. After being woken up by an alarm clock the next morning, he goes to the hotel's spa, and marks everywhere he wishes to go on a map of Disneyland Park and Disney California Adventure Park. 

Goofy then goes on Gadget's Go Coaster in Mickey's Toontown, hesitantly meets Cinderella in front of Sleeping Beauty Castle, goes on Autotopia in Tomorrowland, eats various meals at a restaurant, goes to the swimming pool at the Disneyland Hotel, takes pictures while riding the Golden Zephyr in Paradise Pier, buys various souvenirs at the World of Disney store in Downtown Disney, and concludes the night by watching World of Color at Paradise Bay. Goofy returns to the hotel and after checking off some of the things on his plan, Goofy goes to sleep, only to be woken by the alarm clock.

Cast 

 Bill Farmer as Goofy
 Corey Burton as the Narrator

Release 
The film was posted to the Disney Parks YouTube channel on April 5, 2012.

References

Navigation 

2010s comedy films
2012 comedy films
2010s short films
2012 short films
Disneyland Resort
Disneyland
Disney California Adventure
Films set in California
Goofy (Disney) short films
Films set in hotels
Films set in resorts
Films set in amusement parks
Films about dogs
Walt Disney Parks and Resorts films
2010s children's comedy films
Films about vacationing
American children's comedy films
2012 fantasy films
Films set in Orange County, California
Advertisements
Children's fantasy films